Bảo Yên is a rural district of Lào Cai province in the Northeast region of Vietnam. As of 2003, the district had a population of 73,924. The district covers an area of 821 km2. The district capital lies at Phố Ràng. 
The Giáy language is spoken in some parts of the district by local minorities.
The planned Sapa Airport will be built in this district.

Administrative divisions
Phố Ràng (district capital), Long Khánh, Long Phúc, Việt Tiến, Lương Sơn, Yên Sơn, Xuân Thượng, Minh Tân, Bảo Hà, Cam Con, Kim Sơn, Điện Quan, Thượng Hà, Tân Dương, Xuân Hòa, Vĩnh Yên, Nghĩa Đô and Tân Tiến.

References

Districts of Lào Cai province
Lào Cai province